Psychroflexus gondwanensis  is a halophilic bacteria from the genus of Psychroflexus which has been isolated from am organic lake in Antarctica.

References

Further reading

External links 
Type strain of Psychroflexus gondwanensis at BacDive -  the Bacterial Diversity Metadatabase

Flavobacteria
Bacteria described in 1999